Hong Sun-bo (born 26 March 1968) is a South Korean water polo player. He competed in the men's tournament at the 1988 Summer Olympics.

References

1968 births
Living people
South Korean male water polo players
Olympic water polo players of South Korea
Water polo players at the 1988 Summer Olympics
Place of birth missing (living people)